Sneathiella is a halotolerant, aerobic and chemoheterotrophic genus of bacteria from the family of Sneathiellaceae. Sneathiella is named after the British microbiologist Peter H. A. Sneat.

References

Alphaproteobacteria
Bacteria genera
Taxa described in 2007